Zip was a weekly men's magazine published in the United Kingdom. It was launched on 1 March 2013 as a sister title to Loaded and was published by Blue Publishing for nine issues before being sold to OOHYEAH Publishing. It relaunched in September 2013. The original owners  of Zip launched the title to take on rival titles Zoo and Nuts which were aimed at the same demographic, and had similar content.

Loaded
Loaded launched its weekly sister title, ZIP, after failed bids to acquire rival titles Nuts and Zoo.

Closure
The website for Zip changed to zip-mag.com temporarily and then became zip.am The domain zip.am ceased to be used by the magazine some time in 2015, the Facebook account no longer exists, and the Twitter account is no longer updated.

See also
 Lad culture

References

External links
 Official website (archive)
 "oohyeah.com" - Publisher (archive)

2013 establishments in the United Kingdom
Men's magazines published in the United Kingdom
Weekly magazines published in the United Kingdom
Magazines established in 2013
Magazines disestablished in 2015
Defunct magazines published in the United Kingdom